Frank Evans (1849 – March 11, 1934) was an American actor. He appeared in 170 films between 1908 and 1927.

Selected filmography

 The Vaquero's Vow (1908)
 Nursing a Viper (1909)
 The Woman from Mellon's (1910)
 A Mohawk's Way (1910) as Trapper
 The Modern Prodigal (1910) as guard
 Swords and Hearts (1911)
 The Goddess of Sagebrush Gulch (1912)
 The Musketeers of Pig Alley (1912)
 Won by a Fish (1912)
 One Is Business, the Other Crime (1912)
 The Narrow Road (1912)
 Fate (1913)
 The Yaqui Cur (1913)
 The Woman in Black (1914)
 Her Maternal Right (1916)
 The World's Great Snare (1916)
 The Argyle Case (1917)
 Oh, Johnny! (1918)
 High Pockets (1919)
 The Flaming Clue (1920)
 Experience (1921)
 Love of Women (1924)
 The Police Patrol (1925)
 Running Wild (1927)

External links

1849 births
1934 deaths
American male film actors
American male silent film actors
20th-century American male actors